NGC 3314 is a pair of overlapping spiral galaxies between 117 and 140 million light-years away in the constellation Hydra. This unique alignment gives astronomers the opportunity to measure the properties of interstellar dust in the face-on foreground galaxy (NGC 3314a).  The dust appears dark against the background galaxy (NGC 3314b).  Unlike interacting galaxies, the two components of NGC 3314 are physically unrelated. It was discovered in April 1999.

In a March 2000 observation of the galaxies, a prominent green star-like object was seen in one of the arms.  Astronomers theorized that it could have been a supernova, but the unique filtering properties of the foreground galaxy made it difficult to decide definitively.

Both galaxies are members of the Hydra Cluster.

References

External links 
 
 
 
 
 

3314
Overlapping galaxies
Hydra (constellation)
NGC 3314A
NGC 3314B
18350324
Hydra Cluster
031531